FCG may refer to:

Football clubs 
 FC Goa, an association football club in India
 FC Gratkorn, an association football club in Austria
 FC Gütersloh 2000, an association football club in Germany
 FC Gundelfingen, an association football club in Germany

Other uses 
 Calouste Gulbenkian Foundation, a Portuguese cultural organization
 Fire control group
 Flight Consulting Group, a Latvian holding company
 Flux compression generator
 Fluid construction grammar
 Francis Carruthers Gould (1844–1925), British caricaturist and political cartoonist
 Fujisankei Communications Group, a Japanese media company
 The Fund for Constitutional Government, an American civil rights organization
 FC Grenoble - Rugby Union In France